NA-121 Lahore-V is a constituency for the National Assembly. NA 129 Lahore consists of areas like Hameed Pura, Angori Bagh, Mustafa Abad, Ghazi abad and areas of old NA-122 (Lahore-V).

Members of Parliament

2018-2022: NA-129 Lahore-VII

Election 2002 

General elections were held on 10 Oct 2002. Aitzaz Ahsan of PPP won by 27,072 votes.

Election 2008 

General elections were held on 18 Feb 2008., Shaikh Rohale Asghar prominent leader of PML-N won by 71,342 votes.

Election 2013 

General elections were held on 11 May 2013. Shaikh Rohale Asghar senior politician of PML-N and strong political figure from the constituency won by 119,312 votes and became the member of National Assembly.

Election 2018 
General elections were held on 25 July 2018.

See also
NA-120 Lahore-IV
NA-122 Lahore-VI

References

External links 
 Election result's official website

NA-124